Vladimír Kožuch (born 15 October 1975) is a former Slovak football striker.

Honours
 Slovan Liberec
Czech Cup: 1999–2000

References

External links

Slovak footballers
Slovakia international footballers
FC Spartak Trnava players
Czech First League players
FC Slovan Liberec players
FC Viktoria Plzeň players
Slovak Super Liga players
1975 births
Sportspeople from Malacky
Living people

Association football forwards